The 2008 Winmau World Masters was the fourth major tournament on the BDO/WDF calendar for 2008. It took place from 5–7 December in the Bridlington Spa Royal Hall. Martin Adams beat Scott Waites in the final to take his first Masters title and join an elite list of players to win both the World Championship and the Masters in their career.

Prize money
The total prize money was £50,000.

Draw
Round Five onwards:

References

World Masters (darts)
World Masters
Bridlington
2000s in the East Riding of Yorkshire